Asylum Tour was a concert tour by American heavy metal band Disturbed in support of the group's fifth studio album, Asylum, which was released in August 2010.

The tour began in mid-August 2010 with an appearance as part of a series of concerts held during the Sturgis Motorcycle Rally in Sturgis, South Dakota, United States. This was followed by the commencement of the Uproar Festival, a North American touring event which features Disturbed as headliners and includes acts such as Avenged Sevenfold, Stone Sour and Hellyeah. The festival began in Minneapolis and culminated in Madison, Wisconsin in early October.

In October 2010, it was reported that David Draiman was diagnosed with a "serious throat condition" and, as a result, ten headline U.S. shows following the culmination of the Uproar Festival were canceled. The group reconvened in mid-November for a European leg of the "Taste of Chaos" package tour, which featured Papa Roach, Buckcherry and Halestorm, as well as Disturbed. The leg began in Helsinki and wrapped up in Nottingham, United Kingdom in mid-December.

In mid-January 2011, the band commenced a U.S. leg of the self-created package tour, "Music as a Weapon V", beginning in Bloomington, Illinois. The tour featured co-headliners Korn, as well as acts Sevendust and In This Moment. In April 2011, the tour came to Oceania, with acts Trivium, As I Lay Dying and Forgiven Rival in tow. The Oceania leg began in Perth, Australia and finished in Christchurch, New Zealand.

Lead singer David Draiman has stated that the production levels for the tour will surpass those on previous tours, with an aspect "that no one has ever seen from Disturbed live — very theatrical, very dramatic, very visually stimulating". Radio show hardDrive commented on the stage show, calling it "a total assault of the senses".

Tour dates

 1^ Date supporting Scorpions; non-Uproar Festival appearance.
 2^ Date featuring co-headliners Korn (Korn played last on all dates marked with a diamond (♦)).
 3^ Date part of The Edge's Summer BBQ radio event; non-Mayhem Festival appearance.

 Rescheduled dates

Cancelled dates

Support acts

 As I Lay Dying (April 20–May 6, 2011)
 Buckcherry (November 15–December 13, 2010)
 Forgiven Rival (April 23–April 30, 2011)
 Halestorm (November 15–December 13, 2010)
 In This Moment (January 14–February 8, 2011; March 5–April 5, 2011)
 Papa Roach (November 15–December 13, 2010)

 Sevendust (January 14–February 8, 2011; March 5–April 5, 2011)
 StillWell (March 5–April 5, 2011)
 These Four Walls  (May 3–May 6, 2011)
 Trivium (April 20–May 6, 2011)

Personnel
 David Draiman – lead vocals
 Dan Donegan – guitar
 John Moyer – bass guitar, backing vocals
 Mike Wengren – drums

References

External links
 Official website

2010 concert tours
2011 concert tours